TGX may refer to:
 MAN TGX, a series of trucks produced by the manufacturer MAN Truck & Bus
 ISO 639:tgx, the ISO 639 code for the Tagish language